Solomon Islands competed at the 2017 Asian Indoor and Martial Arts Games in Ashgabat, Turkmenistan from September 17 to 27. Solomon Islands sent a delegation consisting of 18 competitors competing in 3 different sports. The athletes couldn't receive any medal in the competition.

Solomon Islands along with other Oceania nations competed in the Asian Indoor and Martial Arts Games for the first time in history.

Participants

References 

Nations at the 2017 Asian Indoor and Martial Arts Games
Sport in the Solomon Islands
2017 in Solomon Islands sport